KABN-FM was a non-commercial college radio station in Kasilof, Alaska, broadcasting to the Kenai, Alaska, area on 89.5 FM.

History
The call letters KABN were previously used by a station owned by Valley Radio Corporation. That station was licensed to Long Island, Big Lake, Alaska, broadcasting at 830 AM. The station's studios and transmitter were actually located northeast of Big Lake proper, off of Johnson Road. This version of KABN operated from 1979 to 1988, when it was sold to Chester Coleman and subsequently shut down.

The station owner's surrendered KABN-FM's license to the Federal Communications Commission on July 19, 2018, and the FCC cancelled the license.

External links

KABN tribute website

ABN-FM
Radio stations established in 1979
1979 establishments in Alaska
Defunct radio stations in the United States
Radio stations disestablished in 2018
2018 disestablishments in Alaska

ABN-FM